Statistics of Swedish football Division 2 for the 2011 season.

League standings

Norrland 2011

Norra Svealand 2011

Södra Svealand 2011

Norra Götaland 2011

Västra Götaland 2011

Södra Götaland 2011

Player of the year awards

Ever since 2003 the online bookmaker Unibet have given out awards at the end of the season to the best players in Division 2. The recipients are decided by a jury of sportsjournalists, coaches and football experts. The names highlighted in green won the overall national award.

References 

Swedish Football Division 2 seasons
4
Sweden
Sweden